Mohamed El-Tantawy (born 1 January 1980) is an Egyptian weightlifter. He competed in the men's middleweight event at the 2004 Summer Olympics.

References

1980 births
Living people
Egyptian male weightlifters
Olympic weightlifters of Egypt
Weightlifters at the 2004 Summer Olympics
Place of birth missing (living people)